Evgeny Shtembuliak (born 12 March 1999, Chornomorsk, Odesa Oblast) is a Ukrainian chess player. He was awarded the title of Grandmaster by FIDE in 2019.

Shtembuliak was born in Chornomorsk near Odessa, but sometimes has listed the latter as his birthplace. He played on the Ukrainian team in the Under 16 Chess Olympiad in 2014. Shtembuliak won the World Junior Chess Championship and the Ukraine Championship in 2019.

In February of 2022 Shtembuliak escaped the Russian invasion of Ukraine to return to the United States where he teaches chess. He raises funds to support his country during the war crisis by conducting chess camps for kids.

References

External links 
 

1999 births
Living people
Chess grandmasters
Ukrainian chess players
World Junior Chess Champions
Sportspeople from Odesa
Twitch (service) streamers
People from Chornomorsk